Birgitte Federspiel (6 September 1925 –February 2, 2005) was a Danish film, theater and TV actress. She won two Bodil Awards for best actress in 1955 (Ordet) and 1959 (En fremmed banker på).

Born Karen Birgitte Federspiel in Copenhagen, she was the daughter of actor Ejner Federspiel and Gunver Fönss. She had a notable film roles as Inger in Ordet (1955) and, in later life, as Martine in Babette's Feast (1987), while on TV she played Baroness von Rydtger in three episodes of Matador. She died in Odense on February 2, 2005, aged 79.

Personal life 
She was married to Danish actors Freddy Koch and Jens Østerholm.

Selected filmography 

 Jens Langkniv  (1940)
  (1942) – Birgit Ernst
 Jeg mødte en morder (1943) – Pige på cykel (uncredited)
  (1945) – Pige i venteværelse
  (1948) – Grethe
  (1949) – Dronningens kammerpige
 Susanne (1950) – Doris Rudholt
  (1951) – Gerd Møller
  (1952) – Arkæologi-Magisteren Bente Berg
 Adam og Eva (Adam and Eve) (1953) – Tove
 Ordet (1955) – Inger Borgen (uncredited)
 Kispus (1956) – Dora
  (1956) – Nana
 En kvinde er overflødig (1957) – Ester
  (1957) – Misse Lieberg
  (1959) – Vibeke
 Charles' tante (Charles' Aunt) (1959) – Donna Lucia d'Alvadorez / Lise Holm
 Den sidste vinter (The Last Winter) (1960) – Anne Sørensen
 Komtessen (1961) – Gevinde Sonja Hardenborg
 Gøngehøvdingen (The Musketeers) (1961) – Kulsoen
  (1961) – Fru Strand
 Dronningens vagtmester (1963) – Kulsoen
 Hvis lille pige er du? (1963) – Fru Jansen
 Gudrun (Suddenly, a Woman!) (1963) – Husværtinden
 Døden kommer til middag (Death Comes at High Noon) (1964) – Merete Lindberg
 Tine (1964) – Fru Berg
 Dyden går amok (1966) – Inga Forstmand
 Sult (Hunger) (1966) – Her sister
  (1966) – Irene
 Den røde kappe (Hagbard and Signe or The Red Mantle) (1967) – King Hamund's widow
  (1970) – Astrid
 Z.P.G. (1972) – Psychiatrist
 Olsen Banden går amok (The Olsen Gang Goes Crazy) (1973) – Ragna
 Nitten røde roser (19 Red Roses) (1974) – Louise Bech
 Nøddebo Præstegård (1974) – Fru Blicher
  (1976) – Silden
 Julefrokosten (1976) – Asta Asmussen
  (1977) – Anna
 Pas på ryggen, professor (Mind Your Back, Professor) (1977) – Ægtepar i kunstforretning / kone
  (1978) – Frk. Asmussen
 Fængslende feriedage (1978) – Cornelia Møller
  (1984)
  (1987) – Tante Laura
  (1987) – Lotta Henderson
  (1987) – Dronning Caroline Amalie
 Babettes gæstebud (Babette's Feast) (1987) – Martine
  (1994) – Viola
 Barbara (1997) – Ellen Katrine
  (1997) – Mormor
  (1998) – Grandmother
  (2001) – Gundine

References

External links 

 

1925 births
2005 deaths
Actresses from Copenhagen
Best Actress Bodil Award winners
Danish film actresses
Danish stage actresses
Danish television actresses